Ereğli is a city and district of Konya Province in the Central Anatolia region of Turkey. According to 2009 census, the population of the district is 135,008 of which 95,056 live in the town of Ereğli.

History
The ancient town of Heraclea Cybistra (Ηράκλεια Κυβίστρα in Ancient Greek) was located here, and gave its name (Heracles) to the modern town. The town had some importance in Hellenistic times owing to its position near the point where the road to the Gülek Pass (Cilician Gates) enters the hills. It lay in the way of armies and was more than once sacked by the Arab invaders of Asia Minor (AD 805 and 832). During the Crusade of 1101 it was the scene of a failed battle of 15,000 men led by William II, Count of Nevers, which left the Crusaders weak en route to Antioch. It became Turkish (Seljuk) in the 11th century. 

Ereğli is also known for being the first capital of the Karaman Beylik founded by Nure Sufi Bey.  The Karaman state was renowned for being a consistent nuisance to Ottoman dominance in Anatolia, being one of the few Anatolian beyliks to retain sovereignty well past Fatih Sultan Mehmet's conquest of Istanbul.  It was also the first political entity in Anatolia to proclaim Turkish as an official language. In 1553, upon return from a campaign in Persia, Suleiman the Magnificent had his son, Şehzade Mustafa, killed in the Ereğli valley where the Ottoman army was stationed. Modern Ereğli had grown from a large village to a town since the railway reached it from Konya and Karaman in 1904; and it has now hotels and thriving businesses.

Archaeology 

Three hours’ ride south is the famous "Hittite" rock relief of a lynx, representing a king (probably of neighbouring Tyana) adoring a god. This was the first "Hittite" monument discovered in modern times (early 18th century, by the Swede Otter, an emissary of Louis XIV).

Eregli may be the location of the Hittite town of Hupisna (Ḫupišna), where the goddess Ḫuwaššanna was worshipped. She was linked with Gazbaba, a Mesopotamian love goddess also connected with Inanna.

In the early Iron Age, Hupisna also was a neo-Hittite polity in the land of Tabal. Two kings of Hupisna are known from the Assyrian sources: Puḫamme (c. 837 BC) and Urimme (c. 738 BC).

Transportation

Ereğli Gar is the railway station of the town. Once served by several train lines that have destinations to Istanbul, İzmir and Konya, the station is currently served by Mainline / Toros Ekspresi  only, which connects Ereğli to Adana and Karaman.

Notable residents
Nimet Çubukçu, current Minister of Education of Turkey.
Ali Talip Özdemir, former head of the Motherland Party (ANAP)
Şehzade Mustafa, heir to the Ottoman throne who was killed in the Ereğli valley
Volkan Ş. Ediger (born 1953, is a scientist, writer and bureaucrat

International relations

Twin towns — Sister cities
Ereğli is twinned with:
 Hydra, Greece (since 1996)

See also
Çayhan
Kwangjin Park, a park in Ereğli.
Zengen

Notes

References

External links
 District governor's official website 
 District Municipality's official website 

Populated places in Konya Province
Districts of Konya Province